Zameer is a 1975 Hindi action-drama film directed by Ravi Chopra and produced by B. R. Chopra for B. R. Films. It stars Amitabh Bachchan, Saira Banu, Shammi Kapoor, Madan Puri and Vinod Khanna. The music for the film was composed by Sapan Chakraborty.All the songs of the movie was super hit. The movie is based on O. Henry's short story A Double-Dyed Deceiver which was earlier adapted in 1960 as Bombai Ka Babu starring Dev Anand.

The film was commercially successful.

Plot

Maharaj Singh is a proud owner of several derby-winning stallions, and lives in a palatial farmhouse with his wife, Rukmini and young son, Chimpoo. One day dacoits attack his farmhouse with a view of stealing the stallions, but Maharaj fights them, killing the son of the leader of the dacoits, Maan Singh. Maan Singh swears to avenge the death of his son, and abducts Chimpoo. Years later, a servant of Maharaj, Ram Singh, brings a young man named Badal into the Singhs lives, and tells them that he is their missing son Chimpoo. Both Maharaj, Rukmini, and their daughter, Sunita, are delighted at having Chimpoo back in their lives. Then Badal and Sunita fall in love with each other. It is then Badal confesses to Maharaj that he is not Chimpoo, but a former convicted jailbird, who was asked to impersonate him by an embittered Ram Singh. Maharaj does not want to relay this information to an ailing Rukmini, and decides to keep it quiet for the rest of their lives. But sooner or later Rukmini is bound to find out - especially when Badal and Sunita openly show their love - will this shock of an intimate brother and a sister spare her or has fate something else in store for her?

Cast

Amitabh Bachchan as Badal Singh / Fake Chimpoo
Saira Banu as Smita Singh
Shammi Kapoor as Thakur Maharaj Singh
Madan Puri as Daaku Maan Singh
Vinod Khanna as Suraj "Chimpoo" Singh, Daaku Maan Singh's adoptive son & Thakur Maharaj Singh's biological son (Special Appearance)
Indrani Mukherjee as Rukmini Singh, Thakur Maharaj Singh's wife
Ramesh Deo as Ramu (Servant of Thakur Maharaj Singh) 
Jagdish Raj as Sheru

Reception 
Vijay Lokapally, in his review for The Hindu wrote "There was little in the movie to remember. The dialogues were ordinary and less said about the acting the better. Everyone, with the exception of Madan Puri, just about went through the motions. Shammi Kapoor was disappointing as the garrulous stud farm owner.It was certainly not among the best films of Amitabh Bachchan. Or even Vinod Khanna. Yet, it is listed a hit."

Soundtrack
All music for the film was composed by Sapan Chakraborty, and all the songs are written by Sahir Ludhianvi and Rajkavi Inderjeet Singh Tulsi.

References

Sources

External links
 

1975 films
1970s Hindi-language films
Remakes of Indian films
Films directed by Ravi Chopra
1975 directorial debut films